Luis "El Zorro" Álamos Luque (25 December 1923 – 26 June 1983) was a football manager from Chile.

Career
He had a carrer as a forward with Universidad de Chile with Luis Tirado as coach, but Alejandro Scopelli turned him into a midfielder.

álamos guided the national team at the 1966 and 1974 FIFA World Cup but was unable to advance from group stage on both the occasion. Álamos was also manager for Chilean team Colo-Colo for four seasons (1972–1975) and for Universidad de Chile.

References

1923 births
1983 deaths
People from Chañaral
Chilean footballers
Universidad de Chile footballers
Chilean Primera División players
Association football midfielders
Chilean football managers
Chilean Primera División managers
Universidad de Chile managers
Colo-Colo managers
Coquimbo Unido managers
Chile national football team managers
1966 FIFA World Cup managers
1974 FIFA World Cup managers